Kimmo is a Finnish given name for males. Notable people with the name include:

 Kimmo Kapanen (born 1974), Finnish professional ice hockey goaltender
 Kimmo Kiljunen (born 1951), member of the Finnish parliament
 Kimmo Kinnunen (born 1968), former Finnish javelin thrower
 Kimmo Koskenniemi, inventor of two-level models for computational phonology and morphology
 Kimmo Kuhta (born 1975), Finnish professional ice hockey forward
 Kimmo Leinonen (born 1949), Finnish ice hockey executive and writer
 Kimmo Lotvonen (born 1976), defenceman for the Timrå IK hockey team
 Kimmo Pohjonen (born 1964), Finnish accordionist
 Kimmo Tauriainen (born 1972), Finnish professional footballer
 Kimmo Timonen (born 1975), professional ice hockey defenceman
 Kimmo Wilska (born 1956), Finnish journalist

Finnish masculine given names